Patrick Underwood "Pat" Smathers served as the Mayor of Canton, North Carolina from 1999 to 2011.  He ran for Lieutenant Governor of his state in 2008.

Career
He has made his living as an attorney for 27 years. He is the attorney for the Haywood County School System and Haywood Community College. He also serves in the North Carolina Army National Guard as a Lieutenant Colonel, and is a graduate from the United States Army War College Class of 2006.

Smathers is a graduate of Duke University, where he played football under an athletic scholarship. He is also a graduate of the Wake Forest University School of Law.

Political and community involvement
He is a member of the North Carolina Local Government Commission, a member of the Haywood Rotary Club, and is involved in the North Carolina Democratic Party Task Force on Western North Carolina. He was Haywood County's Rotary Citizen of the Year in 2003 and was elected to the Pisgah High School Athletic Hall of Fame in 1999. He also serves as the Vice president of the Haywood County Democratic Men's Club, was chairman of the 2003 Vance-Aycock Dinner, and is a former County party chair.

His 2008 campaign slogan was "Local Leadership, Statewide." Smathers came in third in the May 6, 2008 primary, behind winner Walter H. Dalton and runner-up Hampton Dellinger.

In 2014, Smathers undertook an investigation into allegations of violations of the Equal Access Act related to the attempt by a student to form a Secular Student Alliance club at Pisgah High School in Canton, North Carolina. His report concluded that the allegations were "without merit and baseless." The Freedom From Religion Foundation released a statement saying they were "troubled by the report, which contains many factual errors and focuses on matters that are irrelevant to forming a student club."

References

External links
Campaign site
Canton Mayor and Board of Aldermen
2008 Lt. Gov Platform
Canton Honored as "Cool City"

Year of birth missing (living people)
Living people
North Carolina Democrats
People from Canton, North Carolina
Mayors of places in North Carolina
Duke University alumni
Wake Forest University alumni